"Make It Good" is a song by British-Norwegian boy band A1. It was released on 13 May 2002 as the second single from their third studio album, Make It Good (2002). The single peaked at  11 on the UK Singles Chart.

A music video was produced to promote the single. Two versions of the video exist: one for the radio edit of the song and one for the extended version.

Track listings
UK CD1
 "Make It Good"
 "High and Dry"
 "Do It Again"
 "Make It Good" (video)

UK CD2
 "Make It Good" (extended version)
 "Make It Good" (Johan S vocal mix)
 "Caught in the Middle" (Almighty mix)
 "Make It Good" (video and making of video)

UK cassette single
 "Make It Good"
 "Do It Again"

Charts

Weekly charts

Year-end charts

References

2002 singles
2002 songs
A1 (band) songs
Columbia Records singles
Song recordings produced by Mike Hedges
Songs written by Ben Adams
Songs written by Christian Ingebrigtsen
Songs written by Mark Read (singer)